In Jonathan Swift's 1726 satirical novel Gulliver's Travels, the name struldbrugg (sometimes spelled struldbrug) is given to those humans in the nation of Luggnagg who are born seemingly normal, but are in fact immortal. Although struldbruggs do not die, they do continue aging. Swift's work depicts the evil of immortality without eternal youth.

They are easily recognized by a red dot above their left eyebrow. They are normal human beings until they reach the age of eighty, at which time they become dejected. Upon reaching the age of eighty they become legally dead, and suffer from many ailments including the loss of eyesight and the loss of hair.

Struldbruggs were forbidden to own property:
As soon as they have completed the term of eighty years, they are looked on as dead in law; their heirs immediately succeed to their estates; only a small pittance is reserved for their support; and the poor ones are maintained at the public charge. After that period, they are held incapable of any employment of trust or profit; they cannot purchase lands, or take leases; neither are they allowed to be witnesses in any cause, either civil or criminal or economic, not even for the decision of meers (metes) and bounds.

Because:
Otherwise, as avarice is the necessary consequence of old age, those immortals would in time become proprietors of the whole nation, and engross the civil power, which, for want of abilities to manage, must end in the ruin of the
public.

Related myths
Chinese Taoism placed the Island of the Immortals eastward from China, while Swift places the struldbruggs near Japan.

The term struldbrug has been used in science fiction, most prolifically by Larry Niven, Robert Silverberg, and Pohl & Kornbluth to describe supercentenarians.

Cited in Angela Thirkell's Jutland Cottage, Chapter 10, in a conversation between Dr. Ford and Mr. Macfadyen. (Moyer Bell, 1999)(ISBN 978155921273).

See also
 Brobdingnag
 Tithonus

References

Gulliver's Travels
Fiction about immortality